Route 959 is a regional east-west highway in the Golan Heights. It proceeds from Gonen junction in the west until Baron Junction (pronounced "bar-OWN") in the east.

Junctions on the route

Gonen junction next to Gonen with Route 918
Raveh junction south of Brukhim Kela Alon
Ha'amir junction with Route 978
Poren junction with Route 9881
Bental junction north of Merom Golan
Baron junction with Highway 98

See also
List of highways in Israel

Roads in Israeli-occupied territories